Chittenden County is the most populous county in the U.S. state of Vermont. As of the 2020 census, its population was 168,323. The county seat is Vermont's most populous municipality, the city of Burlington. The county has over a quarter of Vermont's population and more than twice the population of Vermont's second-most populous county, Rutland. The county also has more than twice the population density of Vermont's second-most dense county, Washington. The county is named for Vermont's first governor and one of the framers of its constitution as an independent republic and later U.S. state, Thomas Chittenden.

The county has most of Vermont's fastest growing municipalities. It is one of the three counties that comprise the Burlington metropolitan area, along with the counties of Franklin and Grand Isle to the north and northwest, respectively. The University of Vermont, Vermont's largest university, is located in the county, as well as its affiliated hospital, the UVM Medical Center (which is Vermont's largest hospital and collectively forms the largest employer in the state along with the university). Vermont's largest private employer (GlobalFoundries) and largest airport (Burlington International Airport) are in the localities of Essex Junction and South Burlington, respectively.

The Vermont Army National Guard is based at Camp Johnson in the town of Colchester. The Vermont Air National Guard is based at the Burlington Air National Guard Base on the grounds of the Burlington International Airport in South Burlington.

Geography
It is the third-smallest county in Vermont by area.

Originally, Chittenden County contained parts of other counties. It included all of today's Franklin, Grand Isle, and Lamoille counties, and parts of today's Orleans, Washington, and Addison counties.

Adjacent counties
 Addison County – south
 Clinton County, New York – northwest
 Essex County, New York – west
 Franklin County – north
 Grand Isle County – northwest
 Lamoille County – northeast
 Washington County – southeast

Major highways

Demographics

2018 U.S. census estimates

In 2018, the county had 164,572 people, and 67,271 households, of which 36.23% had children under age 18 living with them, 52.9% were married couples living together, 7.70% had a female householder with no husband present, and 37.70% were not families. About 24.31% of all households were made up of individuals, and 6.72% had someone living alone who was 65 or older.  Average household size was 2.67 and average family size was 3.13.

In 2014, the county was 91.7% White, 2.4% Black or African American, 0.3% Native American and Alaska Native, 3.5% Asian, 0.01% Native Hawaiian and Other Pacific Islander, and 2.1% two or more races. Hispanics or Latinos of any race made up 2.2% of the population.

In the county, age distribution was 18.7% under 18, 15.23% from 18 to 24, 32.05% from 25 to 44, 20.82% from 45 to 64, and 13.2% who were 65 or older.  The median age was 34 years. For every 100 females, there were 94.06 males.  For every 100 females 18 and over, there were 92.30 males.

In 2007, census department estimated that Chittenden had the youngest average age in the state, 37.5. This compares with the actual census in 2000 of 34.2 years.

In 2008, about 29% of the population lived alone; 59% of households consisted of families, and 38% of men and 35% of women, age 15 or older, have never married. About 6% of the population were born in a foreign country, and 8% of residents speak a language other than English at home.

From 2000 to 2008, residents left Chittenden in high numbers for places outside Vermont. Still, population increased slightly, in part due to immigration from foreign countries.

2010 census
As of the 2010 United States Census, 156,545 people, 61,827 households, and 36,582 families were residing in the county.

Of the 61,827 households, 28.8% had children under 18 living with them, 46.4% were married couples living together, 9.1% had a female householder with no husband present, 40.8% were not families, and 27.7% of all households were made up of individuals. The average household size was 2.37, and the average family size was 2.92. The median age was 36.2 years.

The median income for a household in the county was $59,878 and for a family was $78,283. Males had a median income of $49,991 versus $39,213 for females. The per capita income for the county was $31,095. About 6.6% of families and 10.8% of the population were below the poverty line, including 11.8% of those under age 18 and 6.8% of those age 65 or over.

Government
As in all Vermont counties, a small executive function is mostly consolidated at the state level, with a county sheriff and county sheriff's department. The elected sheriff is Daniel Gamelin. Remaining county government is judicial. The area has no "county taxes".

In 2007, median property taxes in the county were $3,809, placing it 265th out of 1,817 counties in the nation with populations over 20,000. This was the highest in Vermont.

Judicial
The elected state's attorney is Sarah George.

Elections
In 1828, Chittenden County voted for National Republican Party candidate John Quincy Adams and in 1832 voted for Henry Clay.

From William Henry Harrison in 1836 to Winfield Scott in 1852, the county voted for the Whig Party candidates.

From John C. Frémont in 1856 to Calvin Coolidge in 1924, the Republican Party had a 68-year winning streak in the county.

In 1928, Chittenden County was won by Democrat Al Smith, making him the first Democratic candidate to carry the county. The county also voted for Franklin D. Roosevelt in all four of his presidential runs from 1932 to 1944. During that time, Chittenden County, along with Franklin and Grand Isle Counties, became Democratic enclaves in an otherwise Republican-voting Vermont. The county also was won by Harry S. Truman in 1948.

Dwight D. Eisenhower was able to win back Chittenden County for the Republicans during the 1952 and 1956 elections. The county went to Democratic candidates John F. Kennedy in 1960, Lyndon B. Johnson in 1964, and Hubert H. Humphrey in 1968.

Incumbent President Richard Nixon carried the county in 1972, as did Gerald Ford in 1976. In 1980, Jimmy Carter narrowly won the county. In 1984, Ronald Reagan became the last Republican presidential candidate to win Chittenden County.

Since Michael Dukakis won the county in 1988, it has been won by Democratic candidates, and along with Windham County, has been considered one of the bluest counties in Vermont. In recent years, the GOP has turned in some of its worst showings in memory. Since Bill Clinton won the county by a nearly two-to-one margin in 1992, no Republican has managed 40% of the county’s vote.

In 2020, Chittenden was the bluest county in the bluest state, backing Joe Biden by a 54% margin.

In gubernatorial elections, Chittenden County is slightly more competitive, as Vermont Republicans are generally far more moderate than at a nationwide level. In the past 10 gubernatorial elections, the county has voted for the Democratic candidate for governor six times and for the Republican candidate four times. More recently, incumbent Republican governor Phil Scott won nearly 67% of the county's votes in the 2020 Vermont gubernatorial election.

|}

Economy

Personal income
According to the U.S. Census, the median household income for the years 2007 and 2011 was $62,260. The per capita income for the same period was $32,533.

As of the 2010 U.S. Census, the median income for a household in the county was $63,989, and the median income for a family was $59,460. Males had a median income of $38,541 versus $27,853 for females. The per capita income for the county was $33,281.  About 4.90% of families and 8.80% of the population were below the poverty line, including 8.00% of those under age 18 and 8.20% of those age 65 or over.

Industry

Essex Junction is home to GlobalFoundries' Burlington Design Center and 200 mm wafer fabrication plant. GlobalFoundries is the largest private employer in the state of Vermont, with approximately 3,000 employees.

Burton Snowboards employs 500 people with a payroll of $28 million in 2008.

Retailing

One measure of economic activity is retail sales. In 2007, Chittenden led the state with 29% of sales, as measured by sales tax reports. This amounted to US$1.52 billion. Four local cities stood among the top five areas in the state: 1- Williston, 2-South Burlington, 4-Colchester, and 5-Burlington.

Real estate
In 2008, a vacancy rate for office space reached 11%, and was called "historic."

Education

K-12 education
Several school districts are within the county, including Burlington, Winooski, and Chittenden East. Teachers' salaries in 2007–8 varied from lows of $33,000 to $38,000 annually. Top salaries ranged from $66,000 to $79,000. Teachers pay from 10 to 20% of their health premiums with many contracts at 12%.

School districts include:
 Burlington School District
 Champlain Valley Unified School District
 Chittenden East Supervisory Union
 Colchester School District
 Essex-Westford Educational Community Unified School District
 Milton School District
 South Burlington School District
 Winooski Incorporated School District

Higher education

Chittenden County is home to the University of Vermont and Champlain College, which are located in the city of Burlington. Saint Michael's College, the Vermont Center of Southern New Hampshire University, and a branch campus of Albany College of Pharmacy and Health Sciences (Vermont's first pharmacy school) are in the town of Colchester. A branch of the Community College of Vermont is located in Winooski and a satellite campus of Vermont Technical College is in Williston.

Personal health and safety
In the first national survey by Robert Wood Johnson Foundation and the University of Wisconsin in 2010, Vermont ranked the highest in the country for health outcomes. The top county in Vermont was Chittenden.

Infrastructure
Consistent with the rest of New England and other counties in the state of Vermont, the county has little formal county government. Few agencies serve county-wide. One is the Chittenden County Solid Waste District. In 2008, the solid waste District announced that it would charge trash haulers $17/ton for recyclables. Formerly, it was paying $7/ton. The global economy has reduced the demand for recycled materials.

Roads
Interstate 89 crosses Chittenden County initially from east to west, then makes a northward turn in South Burlington to run north along the Lake Champlain shoreline.  The full route is generally from southeast to northwest. Seven interchanges are within the county; four provide direct access to U.S. Route 2, which parallels the interstate throughout most of the county. U.S. Route 7, the county's main north–south surface route, is also directly accessible from two interchanges.

The Chittenden County Metropolitan Planning Organization measures traffic, analyzes road conditions, and allocates federal and state funds accordingly.

Communities

Cities
 Burlington (shire town / county seat)
 Essex Junction
 South Burlington
 Winooski

Towns

 Bolton
 Charlotte
 Colchester
 Essex
 Hinesburg
 Huntington
 Jericho
 Milton
 Richmond
 Shelburne
 St. George
 Underhill
 Westford
 Williston

Villages
 Jericho

Census-designated places

 Bolton
 Bolton Valley
 East Charlotte
 Hanksville
 Hinesburg
 Huntington
 Huntington Center
 Milton
 Richmond
 Shelburne
 St. George
 Underhill Center
 Underhill Flats
 West Charlotte
 Westford

Unincorporated communities
In Vermont, gores and grants are unincorporated portions of a county which are not part of any town and have limited self-government (if any, as many are uninhabited).
 Buels Gore
 Jonesville
 Stevensville

See also 
 National Register of Historic Places listings in Chittenden County, Vermont
 USS Chittenden County (LST-561)

References

External links

 Chittenden County Sheriff's Office
 National Register of Historic Places listing for Chittenden Co., Vermont
 Lake Champlain Regional Chamber of Commerce Business and tourism information.

 
1787 establishments in Vermont
Populated places established in 1787
Burlington, Vermont metropolitan area